The NER B and B1 Classes (later London and North Eastern Railway [LNER] Classes N8) were two classes of 0-6-2 tank locomotives designed by Thomas William Worsdell for heavy freight and mineral on the North Eastern Railway, introduced in 1886. They were tank engine versions of the NER C1 Class 0-6-0, using both simple expansion (Class B1) and also the von Borries configuration for two-cylinder compound locomotives (Class B). Both types were later rebuilt using superheated steam and the compounds were also rebuilt as simple expansion locomotives, and eventually formed a single class (albeit with variations in dimensions). Many of the superheated locomotives were also later returned to saturated steam as their original boilers wore out. As a result the classes have had a very complex mechanical history.

B1 Class
The first batch of ten locomotives were built at Darlington Works between June and  November 1886. They had Joy valve gear and slide valves. They were originally designated Class B, but after 1888 were designated B1 class to differentiate them from the compound locomotives. They were given numbers which filled gaps in the sequence between 14 and 1165. An eleventh locomotive of the same design (No. 74) was built at Gateshead Railway Works in March 1888 for the purposes of comparison with a compound version built two months earlier (see below under B class).

All of these locomotives were rebuilt (sometimes on more than one occasion) by Wilson Worsdell and/or  Vincent Raven between 1893 and 1924.

B Class
One similar locomotive (No. 9) was constructed at Gateshead in January 1888, but fitted with the Von Borries compounding system. Its performance was tested against another new-built member of the B1 class (No.74) . As a result of these trials a further fifty were ordered., eleven of which were built at Gateshead between October and December 1888, and the remainder at Darlington between December 188 and May 1890. They were given numbers which filled gaps in the sequence between 136 and 1168.

All of these locomotives were rebuilt (sometimes on more than one occasion) by Wilson Worsdell and/or Vincent Raven between 1904 and 1911, when they were returned to simple locomotives and reclassified B1. Some members of the class retained their  original   cylinders and Joy valve gear, whilst other were fitted with larger  cylinders, or  cylinders with Stephenson valve gear and piston valves.

All members of the B and B1 classes were reclassified  as one single class N8 by the LNER (despite the variations in dimensions and valve gear. They were withdrawn between 1929 and 1956.

References

 

B and B1
0-6-2T locomotives
Railway locomotives introduced in 1886
Scrapped locomotives
Standard gauge steam locomotives of Great Britain
Freight locomotives